Abdallah Sharif (born March 30, 1985) is a Libyan footballer. He currently plays for Libyan Premier League club Madina as a midfielder.

Sharif was called up to the national team for its friendly match against Benin.

References

1985 births
Living people
Libyan footballers
2012 Africa Cup of Nations players
Association footballers not categorized by position